Helen Joseph (born 2
2 May 1989) is a Nigerian professional boxer who has challenged twice for the IBF female featherweight title in 2012 and 2015.

Professional career
Joseph made her professional debut on 10 January 2004, scoring a first-round technical knockout (TKO) victory against Margaret Ibiam in Lagos, Nigeria.

She compiled a record of 9–0 (5 KOs) before capturing her first professional title, defeating Mable Mulenga via unanimous decision (UD) for the vacant WIBF Intercontinental bantamweight title on 21 June 2008 at the Nationalist Stadium in Lusaka, Zambia.

Joseph went 1–1–1 in her next three fights before challenging for her first world title against IBF female featherweight champion Dahiana Santana on 17 December 2012 at the Dominican Fiesta Hotel & Casino in Santo Domingo, Dominican Republic. Joseph failed in her attempt, losing via ten-round UD.

After scoring a first-round knockout (KO) victory against Marianna Gulyas on 3 May 2013, capturing the IBF Intercontinental female featherweight title, Joseph did not compete for two years. Attempts were made in 2014 to schedule a rematch with Santana for the IBF title. However, Santana decided to relinquish the title in February 2014. IBF officials assured Joseph that she would get her shot at the title. The opportunity eventually came against Jennifer Han on 19 September 2015 at the Don Haskins Center in El Paso, Texas. In a fight which saw Joseph score a knockdown in the third round—which Han claimed was a slip—Joseph went on to suffer her third professional defeat, losing by UD with the judges' scorecards reading 98–91, 98–92, and 97–92.

She bounced back from defeat with two stoppage wins—a second-round TKO against Namely Emilia in November 2016 and a second-round KO against Shannon O'Connell in July 2017—before defeating Elizabeth Anderson with a second-round stoppage via corner retirement (RTD) on 4 November 2017, capturing the WBF Intercontinental female bantamweight title.

Her next bout came against Tyrieshia Douglas for the UBF female super-flyweight title on 29 June 2018 at Martin's West in Woodlawn, Maryland. After the ten rounds were completed the bout was ruled a majority draw (MD), with one judge scoring the bout 98–92 in favour of Joseph while the other two scored it even at 95–95.

Following two UD victories—Edina Kiss on 3 August and Martina Horgasz on 29 August—Joseph faced former two-time lightweight world champion Delfine Persoon three months later in November, losing by UD. Joseph suffered her second consecutive defeat in July 2020, losing by UD against Mikaela Mayer.

Professional boxing record

References

External links

Living people
1989 births
Nigerian women boxers
Super-flyweight boxers
Bantamweight boxers
Featherweight boxers